Steve Thomas may refer to:

 Steve Thomas (artist) (born 1944), English designer and visual artist
 Steve Thomas (television) (born 1952), former host of This Old House on PBS, host of Renovation Nation on Planet Green
 Steve Thomas (Royal Navy Fleet Air Arm aviator) (born 1961), Royal Navy Fleet Air Arm aviator
 Steve Thomas (ice hockey) (born 1963), National Hockey League ice hockey player
 Steve Thomas (politician) (born 1967), Western Australian MLA
 Steve Thomas (footballer) (born 1979), Welsh footballer
 Steve Thomas (rugby) (born 1979), Welsh rugby league footballer

Stevie Thomas
 Stevie Thomas (born 1967), Arena football player

See also 
 Steven Thomas (disambiguation)
 Stephen Thomas (disambiguation)